The cigar wrasse, Cheilio inermis, is a species of wrasse native to the Indo-Pacific. They inhabit seagrass beds and algae-covered flats, occasionally in lagoon and seaward reefs to a depth of at least 30 m. They are a mostly solitary species. Their diet includes crustaceans, mollusks, sea urchins, and other hard-shelled prey.

Description

Young individuals are usually a mottled brown or green, sometimes with a broad lateral stripe. Rare individuals may be uniformly yellow. Large males may develop a bright yellow, orange, black, white, or multicolored patch on their sides behind their pectoral fins.

Due to their adult size and diet, they are rarely kept in the aquarium.

References

External links
http://www.marinespecies.org/aphia.php?p=taxdetails&id=218948
 

Labridae
Fish described in 1775
Taxa named by Peter Forsskål